Pierre Perrier (date of birth unknown, died 1925) was a French sports shooter. He competed in the men's trap event at the 1900 Summer Olympics.

References

External links
 

Year of birth missing
1925 deaths
French male sport shooters
Olympic shooters of France
Shooters at the 1900 Summer Olympics
Place of birth missing
Date of death missing
Place of death missing